Year 729 (DCCXXIX) was a common year starting on Saturday of the Julian calendar. The denomination 729 for this year has been used since the early medieval period, when the Anno Domini calendar era became the prevalent method in Europe for naming years.

Events 
 By place 

 Europe 
 Battle of Ravenna: Byzantine troops under Eutychius, exarch of Ravenna, are defeated by an Italian force, raised by Gregory II, in opposition to iconoclasm. 
 An alliance between Duke Eudes of Aquitaine and Munuza, the Moorish governor of Cerdanya, is cemented by marriage to Eudes' illegitimate daughter Lampégia.
 In Denmark, construction of the Kanhave Canal across the island of Samsø is completed. Although the canal is only about 500 metres long, it is one of the largest engineering projects undertaken in Denmark during the Early Middle Ages.

 Britain 
 King Osric of Northumbria nominates Ceolwulf, a distant cousin and brother of Coenred, as his successor. After Osric's death, Ceolwulf takes the throne.

 Asia 
 Battle of Baykand: The Umayyad Arabs narrowly escape disaster when cut off from water by the Turgesh, and push through to reach Bukhara in Transoxiana. 
 Siege of Kamarja: A small Arab garrison defends the fortress of Kamarja against the Turgesh for 58 days, ending with a negotiated withdrawal to Samarkand.

 By topic 

 Food and drink 
 Chinese eating sticks are introduced in the next 20 years in Japan, where people heretofore have used one-piece pincers. The Japanese call them hashi.

Births 
 Du Huangchang, chancellor of the Tang Dynasty (or 728)
 Li Huaiguang, general of the Tang Dynasty (d. 785)

Deaths 
 May 9 – Osric, king of Northumbria
 Ecgberht of Ripon, bishop of Lindisfarne (b. 639)
 Nagaya, Japanese prince and politician (b. 684)
 Shen Quanqi, Chinese poet and official (b. 650)

References